Papyrus Oxyrhynchus 846 (P. Oxy. 846 or E 3074) is a 6th-century manuscript of a portion of the Greek version of the Hebrew Bible (Tanakh or Old Testament) known as the Septuagint. It is one of the manuscripts discovered in Oxyrhynchus, was cataloged under the number 846. Palaeographically dates back to the sixth century CE. It contains Amos 2:6-12. It has been numbered as 906 in the list of Septuagint manuscripts according to classification by Alfreda Rahlfs.

The fragment was published in 1908 by Bernard P. Grenfell and Artur S. Hunt in The Oxyrhynchus Papyri, vol. VI.  It is now in the University of Pennsylvania, catalogued as E 3074.

See also
Amos 2
Oxyrhynchus Papyri
Papyrus Oxyrhynchus 847

References

External links
John R Abercrombie. 'A History of the Acquisition of Papyri and Related Written Material in the University Museum'. Web publication only, c. 1980.
John R Abercrombie. 'The University Museum's collection of Papyri and related Materials'. Expedition (1978).
 B. P. Grenfell & A. S. Hunt, Oxyrhynchus Papyri VI, Egypt Exploration Fund (London 1908), pp. 3–4.

846
6th-century biblical manuscripts
Septuagint manuscripts